The United States Flag Code establishes advisory rules for display and care of the national flag of the United States of America. It is Chapter 1 of Title 4 of the United States Code ( et seq).  Although this is a U.S. federal law, the code is not mandatory: it uses non-binding language like "should" and "custom" throughout and does not prescribe any penalties for failure to follow the guidelines. It was "not intended to proscribe conduct" and was written to "codify various existing rules and customs."

Separately, Congress passed the Flag Protection Act of 1968 (amended in 1989), a since struck-down criminal statute, which prohibits mutilating, defacing, defiling or burning the flag. Although it remains part of codified federal law, it is not enforceable due to the Supreme Court of the United States finding it unconstitutional in United States v. Eichman.

Additionally, the public law which includes the Flag Code (Pub. L. 105–225, largely codified in Title 36 of the U.S. Code), addresses conduct when the U.S. National Anthem is being played while the flag is present. That law suggests civilians in attendance should face the flag "at attention" (standing upright) with their hand over their heart.

Definition of a United States flag 

Summary of the advisory code

 The flag should never be dipped to any person or thing, unless it is the ensign responding to a salute from a ship of a foreign nation. This is sometimes misreported as a tradition that comes from the 1908 Summer Olympics in London, where countries were asked to dip their flag to King Edward VII; American team flag bearer Ralph Rose did not follow this protocol, and teammate Martin Sheridan is often, though apocryphally, quoted as proclaiming that "this flag dips before no earthly king."
 When a flag is so tattered that it no longer fits to serve as a symbol of the United States, it should be replaced in a dignified manner, preferably by burning. The Veterans of Foreign Wars, American Legion, Boy Scouts of America, Girl Scouts of the USA, TrailLife USA, the U.S. Military and other organizations regularly conduct dignified flag retirement ceremonies.
 The flag should never be used as a receptacle for receiving, holding, carrying, or delivering anything.
 The flag should never touch anything physically beneath it.
 The flag should never be used as wearing apparel, bedding or drapery.  It should never be festooned, drawn back, nor up, in folds but always allowed to fall free.
 The flag should always be permitted to fall freely. (An exception was made during the Apollo moon landings when the flag hung from a vertical pole designed with an extensible horizontal bar, allowing full display even in the absence of an atmosphere.)
 The flag should never be carried flat or horizontally.
 The flag should never be used for advertising purposes in any manner whatsoever.
 The flag should never have placed upon it, nor on any part of it, nor attached to it any mark, insignia, letter, word, figure, design, picture, or drawing of any nature.
 The flag should never be upside down, except to signal distress or great danger.
 When displayed vertically against a wall, the union should be to the observer’s left.

Federal Law Regarding Flag Etiquette and National Anthem 
While the Flag Code itself does not directly address behavior during the playing of the National Anthem, the same public law codified elsewhere,  covers suggested respectful conduct.

The relevant part of law for the general public states:

 (b) Conduct During Playing.—During a rendition of the national anthem—
 (1) when the flag is displayed—
 (C) all other persons present should face the flag and stand at attention with their right hand over the heart
 (2) when the flag is not displayed, all present should face toward the music and act in the same manner they would if the flag were displayed.

History

Flag Day
Prior to Flag Day, June 14, 1923, neither the federal government nor the states had official guidelines governing the display of the United States' flag. On that date, the National Flag Code was constructed by representatives of over 68 organizations, under the auspices of the National Americanism Commission of the American Legion. The code drafted by that conference was printed by the national organization of the American Legion and given nationwide distribution.

On June 22, 1942, the code became Public Law 77-623; chapter 435. Little had changed in the code since the Flag Day 1923 Conference. The most notable change was the removal of the Bellamy salute because of its similarities to the Hitler salute.

The Freedom to Display the American Flag Act of 2005 prohibits real estate management organizations from restricting homeowners from displaying the Flag of the United States on their own property.

The Army Specialist Greg L. Chambers Federal Flag Code Amendment Act of 2007 added a provision to allow governors, or the mayor of the District of Columbia, to proclaim that the flag be flown at half-staff upon the death of a member of the Armed Forces from any State, territory, or possession who died while serving on active duty. The provision directs federal facilities in the area covered by the governor or mayor of the District of Columbia to fly the flag at half-staff consistent with such proclamations.

The Duncan Hunter National Defense Authorization Act for Fiscal Year 2009 (Sec. 595.) allows the military salute for the flag during the national anthem by members of the Armed Forces not in uniform and by veterans.

Notes and references

External links

 Full text of United States Code, Title 4, Chapter 1, available at Cornell University Law School.
 "Tattered: Investigation of an American Icon" is a documentary photo essay, investigating the principle identity, misuse, commodification and desecration of the American flag in the context of the U.S. Flag Code.
 “God for Harry! England and Saint George! The Evolution of the Sacred Flag and the Modern Nation-State" is a study of the flag code as a sacred symbol, special issue of The Flag Bulletin, No. 191, Vol. 39, No. 1 (January–February 2000).

Flags of the United States
Title 4 of the United States Code